Chhota Ghallughara ("Smaller Massacre") was a massacre of a significant proportion of the Sikh population living in the region around present-day city of Lahore situated in  Pakistani Punjab and the state of Punjab, India by the Mughal Empire in 1746. Mughal army killed an estimated 7,000 Sikhs in these attacks while an additional 3,000 Sikhs were taken captive. Chhōtā Ghallūghārā is distinguished from the Vaddā Ghallūghārā, the greater massacre of 1762.

Background

Origins of Sikhism
Sikhism began in the days of Guru Nanak (1469–1539) and grew to be a distinctive social force, especially after the formation of the Order of Khalsa in 1699. Since the martyrdom of the fifth Sikh Guru, Guru Arjan Dev Ji in 1606, Sikhs have known the use of arms and the need of self-defense. The Khalsa was designated to oppose the tyranny of the Mughal Empire and any other form of injustice. Through much of the early eighteenth century, the Khalsa was outlawed by the government and survived in the safety of remote forests, deserts, and swamplands of the Punjab region and neighbouring Kashmir and Rajasthan.

Persecution of the Sikhs (1739–46)
Zakariya Khan Bahadur, the Governor of Lahore, offered lucrative rewards for the discovery and killing of Sikhs. A substantial monetary reward was offered for information on the whereabouts of a Sikh. A blanket was offered to anyone who managed to cut off the distinctive mane of a Sikh or Khalsa and a larger sum for the delivery of a Sikh skull. The plunder of Sikh homes was made lawful and anyone giving shelter to or withholding information about the movements of the Sikhs was liable to themselves being executed. Zakaria Khan's police scoured the countryside and brought back hundreds of Sikhs in chains. They were publicly executed at the horse market of Lahore, since renamed "Shahidganj", "place of the martyred".

Bhai Bota Singh
During the days of persecution, Bhai Bota Singh who lived in the forest would come out in search of food from sympathizers and occasionally would visit Amritsar by night and take a dip in the holy pool around Harimandir Sahib. One day he was noticed by some people who thought he was a Sikh but a member of their party objected saying he could not have been a Sikh, for had he been one, he would not have concealed himself so. Other versions of the story say that Mughal guards were passing the forest when one said that the Sikhs were all deceased and there were none left.

Vexed by the observer's remark, Bhai Bota Singh set on a plan whereby he and his companion Bhai Garja Singh took up a position on the main highway near Tarn Taran. There, they proclaimed the sovereignty of Khalsa and collected a small toll tax from each passerby. They also sent a notice with a traveller for the governor to get his attention. After seven days 1000 soldiers with 100 horsemen came to apprehend the two Sikhs who then died fighting.

The Martydom of Mani Singh Shaheed

Bhai Mani Singh was a significant Sikh scholar and teacher who lived in the city of Amritsar, founded by Guru Ram Das. For many years, Sikhs had customarily gathered at Amritsar in the spring and fall for the holidays of Vaisakhi and Diwali. Under the persecution of the Mughals, these festivals had been disrupted.

Bhai Mani Singh sought and obtained Zakaria Khan's permission to hold the Diwali celebration in Amritsar on payment of a tax of 5000 rupees. When Mani Singh found out that the governor had dispatched a large number of soldiers to annihilate the Sikhs gathered at Amritsar, he sent word out to the Sikhs in their forest and desert hideouts, forbidding them from coming.

In consequence, no money was collected and Bhai Mani Singh was prosecuted for not paying the stipulated sum. After a summary trial, he was given the choice of embracing Islam or facing death. Bhai Mani Singh chose the latter and as his punishment, was cut to pieces, joint by joint.

Darbar Sahib and Massa Ranghar
To prevent the Sikhs from accessing the holy shrine "Darbar Sahib", or the "Golden Temple", at Amritsar a Mughal military officer named Massa Ranghar was stationed there. Massa Ranghar was physically strong, fit and tall. Ranghar not only occupied the holy place, but committed sacrilege by carousing with dancing girls and consuming meat and alcohol in the Sanctum Sanctorum situated in the midst of the sacred pool.

This offence continued until news of it reached an isolated band of Sikhs in Rajasthan. Of them, Mehtab Singh and Sukkha Singh set off to cross the distance to Amritsar. Finding the city strongly guarded, the two disguised themselves as revenue officials. In this guise, they entered the Harmandir Sahib, and decapitated Massa Ranghar and escaped before the Mughal soldiers could realise what had happened. This took place on 11 August 1740.

Sukkha Singh'a popularity soared among the Khalsa after this act and he eventually became the leader of a separate Jatha. Sukkha Singh was wounded in the defensive action involving the first Sikh massacre and later died in battle with the invading Afghan army of Ahmed Shah Durrani in 1752.

The Martyrdom of Bhai Taru Singh

Zakaria Khan, the governor of Lahore, experienced great frustration in his effort to decimate the Sikhs. He once asked his men, "From where do the Sikhs obtain their nourishment? I have debarred them from all occupations. They realize no taxes, they do not farm, nor are they allowed to do business or join public employment. I have stopped all offerings to their Gurdwaras. No provisions or supplies are accessible to them. Why do they not die of sheer starvation?"

An informant directed the governor to the village of Puhla where lived a 25-year-old Sikh named Taru Singh who according to the informant would supply food and resources to the Khalsa who were in the forest. Taru Singh's mother and sister both toil and grind grain to make a living, together they earned little but sent what they got.

On hearing this the governor sent a detachment of soldiers to Bhai Taru Singh's village to arrest him and bring him to the provincial capital of Lahore. The year was 1745. When the Sikh heard of their approach, he came out of the village wishing to spare his village any sort of hardship and surrendered to the governor's men. When he refused to convert, his distinctive long hair was scraped from his scalp and the young Sikh left to die. Afterwards Taru Singh was given over to a Sikh family who tended to him for his remaining days.

The Massacre of 1746
It was in this atmosphere of persecution that the Chhōṭā Ghallūghārā took place in 1746. Early in that year, Sukha Singh joined hands with Sardar Jassa Singh Ahluwalia who was the supreme leader of the Dal Khalsa pushing towards the Eminabad territory of Gujranwala district. Jaspat Rai, the local Jagridar was killed in an encounter with the roving band of Sikhs. Jaspat's brother, Lakhpat Rai, who was a diwan (revenue minister) at Lahore, vowed his revenge.

With the help of the new governor, Yahiya Khan, Lakhpat Rai mobilised the Lahore troops, summoned reinforcements, alerted the dependent rulers of the kingdoms in the Himalayan foothills, and roused the population for a genocide of the "infidel" Sikhs. The Sikh inhabitants of Lahore were first rounded up, then executed on 10 March 1746. Hundreds of Sikhs living in Lahore were rounded up daily and executed. Lakhpat Rai went so far as to fill the holy sarovar at Golden temple with sand.

Lakhpat had with him with a large force of mostly cavalry, supported by cannon, with which he surrounded the forest and began a systematic search for the Sikhs.

The Sikhs held out for some time and struck back whenever they could. Heavily outnumbered and under-equipped, they decided to escape to the foothills of the Himalayas to the north. The Sikhs crossed the River Ravi and came in sight of the foothills, a  trek with the enemy in pursuit, only to find the armies of the hill rajas arrayed to oppose them.

Caught between these two armies and running out of food, the Sikhs suffered heavy casualties. In the river crossing, many of the weakened Sikhs were swept away by the current. With Lakhpat Rai's forces still in hot pursuit, they crossed two more rivers, the Beas River and Sutlej, before finally arriving at the sanctuary of the Lakhi Jungle.

An estimated 7,000 Sikhs were killed and 3,000 captured during this operation. The captives were marched back to Lahore, paraded in the streets and publicly beheaded. Given the small numbers of the Sikhs in those days of persecution, the losses will have been a very substantial proportion of their population.

Lakhpat Rai went on to order Sikh places of worship destroyed and their scriptures burnt. He went so far as to decree that anyone uttering the word "Guru" be put to death and even saying the Punjabi language word for sugar, "gur", which sounded like "Guru", could be cause for the death penalty.

See also

 Vadda Ghalughara
 Jallianwala Bagh massacre
 Patharighat massacre
 List of massacres in India

References

External links
  Sikh Ghallugara

History of Sikhism
Massacres of Sikhs
Persecution of Sikhs
Religiously motivated violence in India